Rayevsky (masculine), Rayevskaya (feminine), or Rayevskoye may refer to:

People
Alexander Rayevsky, several people
Maksim Rayevsky (d. 1931), Russian-Jewish anarcho-syndicalist
Mariya Rayevskaya, maiden name of Mariya Volkonskaya
Nikolay Raevsky (1771–1829), Russian general and statesman

Places
Rayevsky (rural locality), a rural locality (a selo) in the Republic of Bashkortostan, Russia
Rayevskoye, name of several rural localities in Russia